Graziela Maciel Barroso (1912-2003) was a Brazilian botanist noted for being a leading expert on the flora of Brazil, as well as a specialist of Compositae.  She was Chairman and Professor of the Department of Plant Biology at the University of Brasília, and published the three-volume Sistemática de Angiospermas do Brasil. 

Barroso identified over one hundred species, and two bromelieads have been named in her honor: Tillandsia grazielae and Tillandsia barrosoae. Also 3 genera of plants have been named after her;  
Grazielanthus (from the family Monimiaceae), Grazielia (from Asteraceae family), and Grazielodendron (from Fabaceae family).

References 

1912 births
2003 deaths
20th-century Brazilian women scientists
20th-century Brazilian botanists